Nick Tarnasky (born November 25, 1984) is a Canadian former professional ice hockey centre. He most recently played for the San Diego Gulls of the American Hockey League (AHL) during the 2016–17 season. Tarnasky previously played in the National Hockey League (NHL) with the Tampa Bay Lightning, Nashville Predators and the Florida Panthers.

Playing career
Tarnasky was drafted in the ninth round, 287th overall, by the Tampa Bay Lightning in the 2003 NHL Entry Draft. On September 29, 2008, he was traded to the Nashville Predators in exchange for a conditional sixth-round pick in the 2009 NHL Entry Draft. On November 27, 2008, he was traded to the Florida Panthers in exchange for Wade Belak. Tarnasky was released from the Panthers in 2010 after the GM allowed his contract to expire.

In 2010, Tarnasky attended training camp with the defending Stanley Cup champion Chicago Blackhawks. After being cut, he signed with the Columbus Blue Jackets, who assigned him to their American Hockey League (AHL) affiliate, the Springfield Falcons. Tarnasky previously played with the Falcons from 2004 through 2006.

On July 3, 2011, Tarnasky signed with Vityaz Chekhov of the Kontinental Hockey League (KHL). During the 2011–12 season, he scored 4 goals in 36 games. 
  
On July 17, 2012, Tarnasky returned to North America to sign a one-year, two-way contract with the Buffalo Sabres. He was assigned to the club's AHL affiliate, the Rochester Americans, for the duration of the 2012–13 season.

On July 6, 2013, Tarnasky left the Sabres as a free agent to sign a one-year contract with the Montreal Canadiens. He was assigned to the club's AHL affiliate, the Hamilton Bulldogs for the duration of the 2013–14 season.

On July 3, 2014, Tarnasky signed a two-year, two-way contract with the New York Rangers.

After two seasons with the Rangers' AHL affiliate, the Hartford Wolf Pack, Tarnasky left at the conclusion of the 2015–16 season as a free agent. On September 8, 2016, he signed a one-year contract with the AHL's San Diego Gulls.

Career statistics

References

External links

1984 births
Canadian ice hockey centres
Florida Everblades players
Florida Panthers players
HC Vityaz players
Hamilton Bulldogs (AHL) players
Hartford Wolf Pack players
Ice hockey people from Alberta
Kelowna Rockets players
Lethbridge Hurricanes players
Living people
Nashville Predators players
People from Clearwater County, Alberta
Rochester Americans players
San Diego Gulls (AHL) players
Springfield Falcons players
Tampa Bay Lightning draft picks
Tampa Bay Lightning players
Vancouver Giants players
Prince Albert Raiders players
Drayton Valley Thunder players
Canadian expatriate ice hockey players in Russia